The Stanford Sleepiness Scale (SSS), developed by William C. Dement and colleagues in 1972, is a one-item self-report questionnaire measuring levels of sleepiness throughout the day. The scale, which can be administered in 1–2 minutes, is generally used to track overall alertness at each hour of the day. The scale has been validated for adult populations aged 18 and older. The SSS is used in both research and clinical settings to assess the level of intervention or effectiveness of a specific treatment in order to compare a clients progress.

Reliability and validity

Reliability 

Reliability refers to whether the scores are reproducible. Unless otherwise specified, the reliability scores and values come from studies done with a United States population sample.

Validity 

Validity describes the evidence that an assessment tool measures what it was supposed to measure. Unless otherwise specified, the reliability scores and values come from studies done with a United States population sample.

Development and history
The SSS was developed to measure subjective sleepiness in research and clinical settings. Other instruments measuring sleepiness tend to examine the general experience of sleepiness over the course of a day, but the SSS met a need for a scale measuring sleepiness in specific moments of time. Because it can be used to evaluate specific moments, the scale can be used repeatedly at different time intervals in a research study or for treatment intervention.

Use in other populations
Since the development of the SSS, there have been other more specific and more recently developed sleepiness rating scales, such as the Epworth Sleepiness Scale, which is more commonly used in other populations. Due to the fact that it has only been translated into English, it is not significantly used in other populations.

Limitations 
The primary limitations of the Stanford Sleepiness Scale is that it is a self-report measure, because of this, levels of sleepiness may be over or under reported based on personal biases. The SSS is free to the general public and can be found in many forms online.

See also
 Sleepiness
 Sleep disorder

References

External links
 SSS Available Online

Diagnostic neurology
Mental disorders screening and assessment tools